Altube is a surname. Notable people with the surname include:

Miguel Altube (born 1960), Argentine field hockey player
Pedro Altube (1827–1905), Basque-born American rancher

See also
Altuve